Hal Chalmers was an American football coach.  He was the head football coach at the Nichols College in Dudley, Massachusetts from 1947 to 1958.

The Hall Chalmers Award which is given annually to the best students Senior Scholar Athlete in the Commonwealth Coast Conference is named in his honor.

Head coaching record

College

References

Nichols Bison football coaches
Nichols Bison football players